Jack Rollan (1916, Lausanne –2007) was a Swiss journalist. He published, among others, books of Léon Savary.

External links 
 

1923 births
2007 deaths
People from the canton of Vaud
Swiss writers in French
20th-century Swiss journalists
20th-century pseudonymous writers